Thoda Tum Badlo Thoda Hum is a 2004 Bollywood film starring Arya Babbar and Shriya Saran in the lead, while Kiran Karmarkar, Ashok Saraf, Nishigandha Wad and Shoma Anand appear as supporting cast. 
The story is a love-hate relationship between two teenagers.

Plot
Raju and Rani are neighbors and studying in same college. But they never settle on their differences and always fight. Rani keeps on making complains against Raju and hence his father scolds his son as good-for-nothing. However, both families have good relationship. Rani's father is a police commissioner and a good friend of Raju's father. The hatred between Raju and Rani takes an ugly turn when Rani slaps Raju during a college competition thus humiliating him.

Rani's father is then transferred to Kodaikanal and as a friendly gesture, Raju along with his parents go to the railway station to bid adieu. Rani is surprised by this change in his behaviour and she too undergoes a change inside her heart towards Raju. The two after separating from each other realise how they actually are in love.

Cast
 Arya Babbar as Raju
 Shriya Saran as Rani
 Kiran Karmarkar as Raju's father
 Ashok Saraf as Rani's father
 Nishigandha Wad
 Shoma Anand
 B. Venkat
 Varsha Kapkar
 Shweta Menon as Guest Appearance

Soundtrack

Reception
Taran Adarsh of IndiaFM gave the film 1 stars out of 5, writing ″On the whole, THODA TUM BADLO THODA HUM is an ordinary fare. However, lack of promotion and face-value will make the film go unnoticed.″

References

External links

2000s Hindi-language films
2004 films
Films scored by Amar Mohile